Ministry of Culture and Tourism may refer to:

Ministry of Tourism and Culture (Ontario), Canada
Ministry of Culture and Tourism of the People's Republic of China
Ministry of Culture and Tourism (Ethiopia)
Ministry of Culture and Tourism (Indonesia)
Ministry of Tourism and Culture (Malaysia)
Ministry of Culture (Pakistan)
Ministry of Culture, Sports and Tourism, South Korea
Ministry of Culture and Tourism (Turkey)
Department for Digital, Culture, Media and Sport, United Kingdom

See also
 Culture minister
 Ministry of Education and Culture
 Ministry of Culture and Sport (disambiguation)
 Tourism minister